The metropolitan city of Kraków, former capital of Poland, is known as the city of churches. The abundance of landmark, historic Roman Catholic churches along with the plenitude of monasteries and convents earned the city a countrywide reputation as the "Northern Rome" in the past. The churches of Kraków comprise over 120 Roman Catholic places of worship, of which over 60 were built in the 20th century. They remain the centers of religious life for the local population and are attended regularly, while some are often crowded on Sundays. 

The number of churches in Kraków still increases. Many of the oldest churches are architectural monuments of Poland's history and culture. They often house religious icons and artifacts revered for their artistic and spiritual value.

Prominent examples
Among the many historic churches in Kraków, the most famous include the Church of St. Peter and St. Paul (Kościół św. Piotra i Pawła) on Grodzka Street, the neighbouring St. Andrew's Church (Kościół św. Andrzeja), The Pauline Church at Skałka (Kościół Paulinow na Skałce), St. Catherine's Church (Kościół św. Katarzyny), the Dominican Church and Monastery (Zespoły klasztorne Dominikanów) and the nearby Monastery-Church of the Franciscan Order (Franciszkani).

Most Roman Catholic churches of special significance for the Poles are located in the Kraków Old Town (Stare Miasto) especially along the Royal coronation route traversed by early Polish monarchs. The Wawel Cathedral on the Wawel Hill dating back to the 14th century includes a Sigismund Chapel – a masterpiece of Polish Renaissance architecture – as well as the Zygmunt bell of 1520, one of the most magnificent bells ever made. The St. Mary's Basilica built in the 14th century at the Main Square is famous for its largest Gothic altarpiece in the world. Basilica of St. Francis of Assisi built in 1237–69 is located on Franciszkanska 2 street opposite the Archbishop Palace. It features stained glass windows by the Young Poland's nominal artist Stanisław Wyspiański. Church of St. Wojciech at the Main Square (Old Town), with a Baroque dome, is one of the oldest stone churches in Poland, with an almost one-thousand-year-old history. Along the Royal Road, there's also the Romanesque St. Andrew's Church at Grodzka street, built in the 11th century, featuring the 17th-century Baroque interior. Right next to it, there's the striking Baroque Church of St. St. Peter and Paul with oversized stone statues of 12 Apostles in the front – the most revered Baroque church of the 17th century behind Rome’s del Gesu. St. Florian's Church on Warszawska street is where the Royal Road begins. It is a Collegiate church and a mausoleum for the relics of St. Florian, the Patron saint of Poland.

Other notable churches are the Baroque Church of St. Anne's, a Collegiate church built 1689–1705 by Tylman van Gameren; the Church of St. Barbara's with Baroque interior,  at pl. Mariacki square, next to the Basilica of the Virgin Mary's; and, the Baroque Church of St. Bernard's next to Wawel, with many paintings. The notable old churches outside of the Old Town include the 13th-century Gothic Basilica of the Holy Trinity at the Dominikanski square; and, the Church of Corpus Christi in Kazimierz district, which dates back to mid-14th century and features an impressive high altar built in 1634.

The Church of St. Casimir the Prince located at ul. Reformacka 4 street in the Old Town district (Stare Miasto), (adjacent to Baroque Franciscan Monastery) with the catacombs in the crypt, contains some of the most secret places in the city. The crypt holds almost 1,000 mummified bodies put on public display but once a year on All Souls Day. The unique climatic conditions found in the basement caused the bodies of the dead to undergo the process of natural mummification and are in excellent state still today (see: picture gallery). The High Gothic Church of St. Catherine's in Kazimierz – next to Skałka – features a 3-story high Baroque altarpiece; the Romanesque Church of the Holiest Savior at Bronisławy street was rebuilt 1670–1673. The Gothic Church of the Holy Cross at pl. Sw. Ducha square has Baroque altarpieces; the Church of the Lord's Transfiguration, built 1714–1727, is also found in the Old Town; the Gothic Church of St. Mark at the corner of Sławkowska and Marka streets has a Renaissance interior. The Church of the Mother of God, the Queen of Poland in Bienczyce district of Nowa Huta, an ultra-modern church built in the shape of the Noah's Ark, with a lunar stone in its Tabernacle brought back from the Moon by American astronauts. Other notable churches include the Church of St. Nicholas with a 15th-century altarpiece; the Church of St. Norbert with a Rococo altarpiece from mid-18th century; the Church of St. Theresa with its 14th-century statue of the Madonna; the Church of the Virgin Mary's Annunciation with an Italian-Baroque interior circa 1675 and the adjacent Carmelite monastery.

Beside the predominantly Roman Catholic churches active in the city, there's a small, but visible representation of a number of other religious denominations, among them: the Lutheran Congregation at the Church of St. Martin's (św. Marcina) built in the years 1637-1640, located at 58 Grodzka street; the Evangelical Church 'Mission of Grace' at Lubomirskiego 7a, and the Methodist Church at Długa 3; Christ the Saviour Presbyterian Church at Smolki 8, the Orthodox Church at Szpitalna 24; Baptist Church 'Bethel' (PL: 'Betel') at 12/3 Zacisze; Ukrainian Greek Catholic Church at Wiślna 11, Pentecostal Church 'Bethlehem' at Lubomirskiego 7a; Seventh-day Adventists at Lubelska 25 street; and a small Muslim community without a mosque, gathering at the Studium Jezyka Polskiego of the Krakow Polytechnic at Skarzynskiego 1 street.

Picture gallery

List of churches of Kraków in alphabetical order 
For list of churches by street name, please use table-sort buttons.

The following list contains the complete list of active Roman Catholic churches in and around the city of Kraków, including churches which were Roman Catholic in the past, and today are under the care of other religious denominations.

List of inactive churches 
For list of churches arranged by street name, please use table-sort buttons.

See also

 Lesser Polish Way

Notes and references

  Historia, opis i galeria zdjęć kościołów Krakowa
  Kościoły Krakowa 
  Nieistniejące kościoły Krakowa
 Michał Rożek, B. Gondkowa, Leksykon kościołów Krakowa, Kraków 2003, 

Buildings and structures in Kraków
Christianity in Kraków
Krakow